Crown of Phantoms is the seventh and final studio album by American metal band Chimaira. It was released on July 30, 2013, via record label E1 Music. It is the first and only Chimaira album to feature Austin D'Amond, Jeremy Creamer, Sean Zatorsky, Emil Werstler, and Matt Szlachta, who all joined the band during 2011 and 2012 and left the band in September 2014.

Release
On April 18, 2013, Chimaira announced their seventh studio album, Crown of Phantoms, along with a release date of July 30, 2013.  The band also announced an Indiegogo crowdfunding campaign for the release of their album.  Contributions for the campaign would fund a Fan Edition CD/DVD version of album which included additional tracks, a documentary, and other exclusive features. The campaign was successfully funded on June 2, 2013. On June 4, 2013, the band revealed the album's track listing and cover artwork.

On May 14, 2013, Chimaira released the album's first single, "All That's Left Is Blood", along with an accompanying music video. A second single, "No Mercy", and music video was released on June 18, 2013.
The album reached position 52 on the Billboard 200 charts on its first week of release, selling around 7,400 copies and 1,800 on the second week. This was improvement from the previous album's debut at No. 54.

Crown of Phantoms was included into the list of "Axl Rosenberg's Top Fifteen Metal Albums of 2013" according to MetalSucks.

Recording and production

The album was mastered by Dan Millice to a high compressed dynamic range of only 4 or 5 dB, and using limiting to reach peak RMS amplitudes of 0.00 or -0.01 dB per song (excluding instrumental). Such dynamic ranges are considered very low.
This is exemplary of the loudness war and causes audible distortions in the music.

Track listing

Personnel
Chimaira
 Mark Hunter – lead vocals
 Austin D'Amond – drums
 Sean Zatorsky – keyboards, synthesizers, backing vocals
 Emil Werstler – lead guitar
 Jeremy Creamer – bass
 Matt Szlachta – rhythm guitar
Additional musicians
Steve Basil – piano on "King of the Shadow World"
Production
Patrick Finegan – artwork, art direction
Scott Givens – A&R
Dan Millice – mastering
Ben Schigel – production, engineering, mixing
Mark Lewis, Jim Stewart, Tony Gammalo – producers (assistant)
Ben Hostetler – engineering (assistant)
Recorded and mixed at Spider Studios (Cleveland, Ohio, United States)
Guitars re-amped at Audiohammer Studios (Orlando, Florida, United States)
Mastered at Engine Room Audio (New York City, United States)

References

2013 albums
Chimaira albums
E1 Music albums
Crowdfunded albums
Indiegogo projects